Akshay Kumar Baral (1860–1919) was a Bengali poet and writer. He was born in Kolkata. The family originally hailed from Chandannagar, Hooghly District.

Early life 
Baral was born in 1860 in Chorbagan, Calcutta, Bengal Presidency, British India. He studied at Hare School for some time. He worked as an accounts clerk in the Delhi and London Bank. He worked as a secretary at the North-British Life Insurance Company.

Career
Boral was a fan of the poets, Biharilal Chakraborty and Rabindranath Tagore. His poetry is meditative and thoughtful. However, he wrote with a unique style and he was not influenced by either one.

Bibliography
Poetry
Prodip
Kanakanjoli
Shankha
Esha
Vul
Chandidas

References

External links
 
 

Bengali male poets
19th-century Bengali poets
20th-century Bengali poets
Bengali-language poets
Bengali-language writers
1860 births
1919 deaths
Bengali Hindus
Hare School alumni
People from Kolkata
Writers from West Bengal
Poets from West Bengal
Indian poets
Indian male poets
Indian male writers
20th-century Indian writers
19th-century Indian writers
19th-century Indian male writers
20th-century Indian male writers
19th-century Indian poets
20th-century Indian poets
19th-century Bengalis
20th-century Bengalis
19th-century male writers
Hindu poets
Male poets
19th-century poets
20th-century poets
Bengali poets